Edward Wesson RI RSMA (April 29, 1910 – 1983) was an English watercolour artist.

Early life

Wesson was born in Blackheath, in south west London.

Work

His work is known for its simplicity, boldness and mastery of brushwork. He is remembered by many painters as a very encouraging teacher.

Personal life

He had one daughter, Elizabeth Wesson.

Bibliography
 Ron Ranson: The Art of Edward Wesson, 1993. 
 Steve Hall & Barry Miles: The Watercolours of Edward Wesson, 2004. 
 Barry Miles: Edward Wesson 1910 - 1983, 1999.

References

External links
 Works by Wesson at Art UK

1910 births
1983 deaths
20th-century English painters
English male painters
Modern painters
English watercolourists
British railway artists
20th-century English male artists